Das Göttliche (The Divine) is a hymn in the Weimar Classicism style written by Johann Wolfgang von Goethe. It was composed in 1783, and first appeared in 1785 without Goethe's consent in the publication On the Teachings of Spinoza by Friedrich Heinrich Jacobi. The first version authorised by Goethe himself was published in 1789.

Lyrics

References

Poetry by Johann Wolfgang von Goethe
1783 poems
Neo-Spinozism